USS LST-569 was a United States Navy  used in the Asiatic-Pacific Theater during World War II.

Construction and commissioning
LST-569 was laid down on 24 March 1944 at Evansville, Indiana, by the Missouri Valley Bridge and Iron Company. She was launched on 20 May 1944, sponsored by Mrs. George W. Lamb, and commissioned on 5 June 1944.

Service history
During the war, LST-569 was assigned to the Pacific Theater of Operations. She took part in the Philippines campaign, participating in the Battle of Leyte landing in October and November 1944, the Invasion of Lingayen Gulf in January 1945, the Manila Bay-Bicol operations at the end of January 1945. On 16 February she left Leyte with Convoy IG 9 en route to Hollandia, arriving 22 February 1945. She then participated in the Battle of Mindanao in April and May 1945, before again traveling from Leyte to Hollandia, this time with Convoy IG 22, from 14 to 20 May 1945.

Following the war, LST-569 performed occupation duty in the Far East and saw service in China until mid-May 1946. The ship was decommissioned on 13 June 1946 and struck from the Navy list on 15 October that same year. On 5 December 1947, she was sold to Bosey, Philippines.

Honors and awards
LST-569 earned four battle stars for her World War II service.

References

Bibliography

External links

LST-542-class tank landing ships
World War II amphibious warfare vessels of the United States
Ships built in Evansville, Indiana
1944 ships